The following is a list of awards and nominations received by American actor, director and producer Robert Redford. He was first nominated for an Academy Award in 1973 for his role as Johnny "Kelly" Hooker in The Sting. He then won Best Director in 1980 for Ordinary People. In 1994, he was nominated twice for Best Picture and Best Director for Quiz Show. He has been nominated for seven Golden Globes, winning two for Inside Daisy Clover as New Star of the Year – Actor (1965), Ordinary People as Best Director (1980), and won the Cecil B. DeMille Award in 1994. He was awarded the Screen Actors Guild Life Achievement Award in 1995.

Academy Awards

BAFTA Awards

Directors Guild of America Awards

Golden Globe Awards

Golden Raspberry Awards

Screen Actors Guild Awards

Film critic awards

Other awards

References

External links
 

Redford, Robert